Scuderia Vittoria is a British motor racing team. The team was formed in late 2010 and is the brainchild of ex-BTCC racers Tom Ferrier and Danny Buxton along with multiple GT and single-seater championship team manager, Piers Masarati. The Middlesex based team ran a Ferrari 458 GT3 and a Ginetta G50 GT4 car in the 2011 British GT season. They also fielded up to 4 Renault Clio's in the UK Renault Clio Cup series.

At the conclusion of the 2011 season, the team had achieved 12 wins over both classes with their maiden win at the first round of the British GT championship at Oulton Park.

Results

Full Season

British GT

 D.C. = Drivers' Championship position.

Renault UK Clio Cup

 * = Guest driver ineligible for points, D.C. = Drivers' Championship position, T.C. = Teams' Championship position

Partial Season

Renault Dutch Clio Cup

 * = Guest driver ineligible for points, D.C. = Drivers' Championship position.

FIA GT3 European Championship

 D.C. = Drivers' Championship position.

FIA GT4 European Championship

 * = Guest driver ineligible for points, D.C. = Drivers' Championship position.

Blancpain Endurance Series

 D.C. = Drivers' Championship position.

Britcar MSA British Endurance

References

External links
 

British auto racing teams
Auto racing teams established in 2010
2010 establishments in England
British GT Championship teams
Blancpain Endurance Series teams